Bagrati Niniashvili (born 1 October 1998) is a Georgian judoka.

He is the bronze medallist of the 2019 European Games in the -66 kg category.

References

External links
 

1998 births
Living people
Male judoka from Georgia (country)
Judoka at the 2019 European Games
European Games medalists in judo
European Games bronze medalists for Georgia (country)
21st-century people from Georgia (country)